Shao Huaze (born June 1933) is a lieutenant general in the People's Liberation Army of China. He served as president of the People's Daily from 1992 to 2000 and president of the All-China Journalists Association from 2000 to 2016.

He was a member of the Standing Committee of the 9th and 10th Chinese People's Political Consultative Conference. He was a delegate to the 4th National People's Congress. He was a member of the 14th and 15th Central Committee of the Chinese Communist Party.

Biography
Shao was born in Chun'an County, Zhejiang, in June 1933. He secondary studied at Yanzhou High School. 

He enlisted in the People's Liberation Army (PLA) in 1950, and joined the Chinese Communist Party (CCP) in 1957. Since 1953, he studied, then taught, at what is now the Second Military Medical University. From 1958 to 1960, he did his postgraduate work at the Renmin University of China. In April 1964, he became an editor of the People's Liberation Army Daily, and was elevated to its deputy president in October 1981. He was head of the Propaganda Division of the People's Liberation Army General Political Department in February 1985, and held that office until June 1989. 

He was appointed editor-in-chief of the People's Daily in June 1989, concurrently serving as vice president of the All-China Journalists Association since January 1991.  He rose to become president of the People's Daily in November 1992, and served until June 2000.  

He was chosen as president of the All-China Journalists Association in October 1996, a post he kept until November 2016. 

He also served as dean of the School of Journalism and Communication, Peking University from May 2002 to October 2013, honorary president of the Photojournalist Society of China, and honorary president of the China Newspaper Association.

He was promoted to the rank of major general (shaojiang) in September 1988 and lieutenant general (zhongjiang) in July 1994.

Publications

References

1933 births
Living people
People from Chun'an County
PLA Second Military Medical University alumni
Renmin University of China alumni
Chinese photographers
Chinese editors
People's Liberation Army generals from Zhejiang
People's Republic of China politicians from Zhejiang
Chinese Communist Party politicians from Zhejiang
Members of the Standing Committee of the 9th Chinese People's Political Consultative Conference
Members of the Standing Committee of the 10th Chinese People's Political Consultative Conference
Delegates to the 4th National People's Congress
Members of the 14th Central Committee of the Chinese Communist Party
Members of the 15th Central Committee of the Chinese Communist Party